Boston Strong: A City's Triumph Over Tragedy is a non-fiction book about the Boston Marathon bombings by The New York Times best-selling author Casey Sherman and veteran Boston journalist Dave Wedge. The book was released in February 2015 by University Press of New England. The book was used as a basis for the 2016 CBS Films motion picture Patriots Day, starring Mark Wahlberg, John Goodman, and J. K. Simmons, and directed by Peter Berg.

References

Works about the Boston Marathon bombing
2015 non-fiction books
University Press of New England books